Dvora Netzer (born Dvora Nosovistzky on 1 May 1897, died 4 January 1989) was an Israeli politician who served as a member of the Knesset for Mapai, the Labor Party and the Alignment between 1949 and 1969.

Biography
Born in Mena in the Russian Empire (today in Ukraine), Netzer was a member of HeHalutz and Youth of Zion youth movements, and later joined the Zionist Socialist Workers Party.

In 1925, she made aliyah to Mandatory Palestine, where she worked as a teacher, becoming headmistress of a school for working youths, a job she held between 1925 and 1949. In 1933 she founded the Working Mothers Organisation in Tel Aviv, serving as its secretary until 1967. She was also a member of the Na'amat central committee and the Women Workers Council.

A member of Ahdut HaAvoda and later Mapai, she was a member of Mapai's central committee. In 1949, she was elected to the first Knesset on the party's list. She was re-elected in 1951, 1955, 1959, 1961 and 1965. She retired from political life during the 1969 elections.

Between 1965 and 1969, she served as a Deputy Speaker of the Knesset. In this position, in November 1968, Netzer was formally selected as Acting Speaker of the Knesset and de facto served as Acting President of the State for a period of five days (17–21 November).

Netzer died in 1989 and was buried in the Trumpeldor Cemetery in Tel Aviv. She had two children: Colonel Moshe Netzer and Prof. Rina Shapiro.

References

External links

1897 births
1989 deaths
People from Chernihiv Oblast
Ukrainian Jews
Soviet emigrants to Mandatory Palestine
Jews in Mandatory Palestine
Ahdut HaAvoda politicians
Mapai politicians
Alignment (Israel) politicians
Israeli Labor Party politicians
Women members of the Knesset
National University of Kharkiv alumni
Members of the 1st Knesset (1949–1951)
Members of the 2nd Knesset (1951–1955)
Members of the 3rd Knesset (1955–1959)
Members of the 4th Knesset (1959–1961)
Members of the 5th Knesset (1961–1965)
Members of the 6th Knesset (1965–1969)
20th-century Israeli women politicians
Burials at Trumpeldor Cemetery